Be Like That may refer to:

 "Be Like That" (3 Doors Down song), 2000
 "Be Like That" (Kane Brown, Swae Lee and Khalid song), 2020